Tokuo is a masculine Japanese given name and surname. It may be written:

 With two kanji, the first read  (e.g.  "virtue";  "lead";  "sincere") and the second 
"nineteen"), and the third read 

In given names,  is written with kanji meaning "masculine" or "male" (e.g. ), while in surnames  may be written with a variety of kanji (e.g.  "tail").

Notable people with the given name include:
, Japanese politician
, Japanese painter
, Japanese speed skater
, Japanese politician
, better known as Daizen Takahiro, Japanese sumo wrestler

See also
People with the given name or surname Tokuo on Japanese Wikipedia

References

Japanese masculine given names
Japanese-language surnames